Erland Koch (4 July 1913 – 5 March 1972) was a Swedish sports shooter. He competed at the 1936 Summer Olympics and 1948 Summer Olympics.

References

External links
 

1913 births
1972 deaths
Swedish male sport shooters
Olympic shooters of Sweden
Shooters at the 1936 Summer Olympics
Shooters at the 1948 Summer Olympics
Sportspeople from Västra Götaland County